Goniomonadea is a proposed class of cryptomonads which includes the orders Goniomonadida and Hemiarmida.

Taxonomy
 Order Goniomonadida Novarino & Lucas 1993 [Goniomonadales Novarino & Lucas 1993]
 Family Goniomonadidae Hill 1991 [Goniomonadaceae Hill 1991]
 Genus Goniomonas von Stein 1878
 Order Hemiarmida Cavalier-Smith 2017
 Family Hemiarmidae Cavalier-Smith 2017
 Genus Hemiarma Shiratori & Ishida 2016

References

Cryptomonads